Khoon Khoon is a 1973 Bollywood action thriller film directed by Mohammed Hussain and stars Mahendra Sandhu, Danny Denzongpa and Rekha in lead roles. The film is the remake of the Clint Eastwood thriller Dirty Harry.

Plot 
A psychopathic killer goes on killing throughout the city. He terrorizes the city and throws challenge to the police force. A tough cop Anand investigates the case and starts hunting for the killer to save his potential victims.

Cast
 Danny Denzongpa as Raghav
 Mahendra Sandhu as Anand
 Rekha as Rekha
 Faryal as Dancer
 Murad as Police commissioner
 Helen   
 Jagdeep as Pancham

Songs
"Kitni Thandi Pawan" - Tirath Singh, Asha Bhosle
"Maati Ke Jalte Deepak Ki Jyot" - Mohammed Rafi
"Meri Aankho Me Masti Hai" - Vijay Singh, Asha Bhosle
"Teri Meri Meri Teri Acchi Hui Dosti" - Kishore Kumar, Sushma Shrestha, Jayashree Shivaram

References

External links
 

1973 films
1970s Hindi-language films
1973 action films
Hindi-language action films
Indian remakes of American films
1970s serial killer films